General Belgrano Department may refer to:

 General Belgrano Department, Chaco
 General Belgrano Department, La Rioja, in La Rioja Province, Argentina
 General Manuel Belgrano Department, in Misiones Province, Argentina

See also 
 General Belgrano (disambiguation)

Department name disambiguation pages